Vladislav Shchepotkin (born 4 November 1996) is a Russian sport shooter.

He participated at the 2018 ISSF World Shooting Championships, winning a medal.

References

External links

Living people
1996 births
Russian male sport shooters
ISSF pistol shooters